John, Johnny, or Johnnie Wright may refer to:

Arts and entertainment

Literature
John Wright (poet) (1805–1843), Scottish poet
John Clifton Wright (born 1948), American sailor and author
John C. Wright (author) (born 1961), American science fiction and fantasy writer

Performing arts
Johnnie Wright (1914–2011), American country musician, singer, songwriter
Johnny Wright (guitarist) (1930–1988), American blues musician
John Wright (pianist) (1934–2017), American jazz pianist
John Robert Wright (born 1942), American actor, commonly known as Bobby Wright
Johnny Wright (music manager) (born 1960), American music act manager
John Wright (musician) (born 1962), Canadian drummer
John Wright (film editor) (active since 1978), American film editor

Visual arts
John Michael Wright (1617–1694), Scottish painter
John Masey Wright (1777–1866), English watercolour-painter
John William Wright (1802–1848), English painter
John Christie Wright (1889–1917), Scottish-born Australian sculptor
John Lloyd Wright (1892–1972), American architect and toy designer
John Buckland Wright (1897–1954), New Zealand illustrator

Business and industry
John Wright (bookseller died 1658) (fl. 1602–1658), English publisher and bookseller
John Wright (businessman) (fl. 1724–1787), American businessman who established Wright's Ferry
John Wright (bookseller died 1844) (1770/1–1844), English bookseller, author, editor and publisher
John Wright (shipbuilder) (1835–1910), Scottish/Australian shipbuilder
Sir John Wright, 1st Baronet (1843–1926), British steel manufacturer

Military
John Wesley Wright (1769–1805), British Royal Navy commander and captain
John Gibson Wright (1837–1890), American Union brevet brigadier general during the Civil War era
John M. Wright (1916–2014), United States Army officer
John Wright (British Army officer) (1940–2016), British Army brigadier

Politics and law

Australia
John James Wright (1821–1904), Australian flour miller, councillor and politician
John Arthur Wright (1841–1920), Australian company manager, politician and railways commissioner
John Wright (Tasmanian politician) (1892–1947), Australian politician

U.K.
John Wright (Ipswich MP) (1615–1683), English politician
John Cecil-Wright (1886–1982), British politician, Member of Parliament for Birmingham Erdington
John Oliver Wright (diplomat) (1922–2009), British diplomat

U.S.
John C. Wright (Ohio politician) (1783–1861), U.S. Representative from Ohio
John C. Wright (New York politician) (1801–1862), American politician from New York
John Vines Wright (1828–1908), American congressman and state supreme court justice
John B. Wright (fl. 1868–1872), American tailor and legislator in South Carolina
John T. Wright (fl. 1952), African American politician
John F. Wright (1945–2018), American jurist, Nebraska Supreme Court justice
John A. Wright (born 1954), American politician, Oklahoma State Representative and Lieutenant Governor Candidate
John Wright (Missouri politician) (born 1976), American politician

Elsewhere
John Wright (New Zealand politician) (born 1945), New Zealand MP

Religion
John Wright (Master of Trinity Hall, Cambridge) (died 1519), English priest and academic, Master of Trinity Hall
John Wright (Archbishop of Sydney) (1861–1933), Anglican bishop in Australia
John Wright (cardinal) (1909–1979), American Roman Catholic cardinal

Sports

American football
John W. Wright (active 1894), American college football coach
John Wright (wide receiver) (born 1946), American football player
John Wright (American football coach) (born 1948), American college football coach

Association football (soccer)
Jocky Wright (John Wright, 1873–1946), Scottish footballer
John Stewart Wright (1890–1956), Scottish footballer
John Wright (footballer, born 1916) (1916–1999), English football half back for Darlington
John Wright (footballer, born 1933), English football goalkeeper for Colchester United
Johnny Wright (footballer) (born 1975), Northern Irish footballer

Cricket
John Wright (Sheffield cricketer) (1796–1857), English cricketer associated with Sheffield Cricket Club
John Wright (cricketer, born 1861) (1861–1912), English cricketer
John Wright (cricketer, born 1935), English cricketer
John Wright (cricketer, born 1954), New Zealand cricketer, former coach of the Indian cricket team

Other sports
John Wright (greyhound trainer) (1899–1980), English greyhound trainer
Johnny Wright (baseball) (1916–1990), American Negro league baseball player
John Wright (basketball) (1921–2008), American basketball player
Johnny Wright (boxer) (1929–2001), British Olympic boxer and referee
John Wright (ice hockey) (born 1948), Canadian ice hockey player
John Wright (curler) (fl. 1967), American curler
John Wright (rugby league) (fl. 1970s), New Zealand rugby league player
John "Rookie" Wright (born 1973), American handball player

Others
John Wright (1568–1605), English conspirator, member of the 1605 Gunpowder Plot
John Wright (inventor) (1808–1844), English surgeon and inventor
John Wright (doctor) (1811–1846), American doctor and botanist
John Skirrow Wright (1822–1880), English pioneer and social improver
John Henry Wright (1852–1908), American classical scholar
John Kirtland Wright (1891–1969), American geographer
John Farnsworth Wright (1929–2001), British economist
John Paul Wright, American criminologist known for his work in biosocial criminology

See also
Jack Wright (disambiguation)
Jackie Wright (c. 1905–1989), Irish comedian
Jonathan Wright (disambiguation)
Wright, an occupational surname originating in England